The  was a postal administration established by the Meiji period Empire of Japan in late Joseon dynasty Korea.

History
The first Japanese post office in Korea was established in 1876 under the terms of the Japan–Korea Treaty of 1876 in Japanese consulate district within the open port of Busan. Post offices in Wonsan and Incheon (Chemulpo), ports which had also been opened to foreign trade by the treaty, were established in 1880 and 1883, respectively. A post office was also established in the capital of Seoul in 1888. Additional Japanese post offices/agencies were opened from 1896, particular from 1899, first in other treaty ports including Masan and Gunsan, then other inland places, predominantly as a political measure, as few initially made a profit.

Inauguration
The inauguration of a Korean postal system initially was attempted in November 1884, but soon was interrupted by the Gapsin Coup half a month later, and officially terminated. 
Korea resumed its own postal service in 1895, domestic business only in the beginning. By 1 January 1900 Korea became a full member of the Universal Postal Union, with its own foreign postal service, which was able to compete against the Japanese post system. Many foreigners resident in Korea, including many Japanese, preferred to use the Korean postal service to write overseas, as the depreciated Korean silver currency resulted in somewhat cheaper postal rates. 
However, following the Russo-Japanese War and the annexation of Korea in 1905, the entire Korean Empire postal services became amalgamated with the Japanese postal services, and Japanese post stamps continued to be used in Korea until the end of World War II.

See also
Postage stamps and postal history of Korea

References

Citations

Sources 
 Mizuhara, Meiso. Korean Postal History 1884-1905. Tokyo: Japan Philatelic Publications, 1993.

External links
The Japanese Post In Korea - an award-winning exhibit by Dr. Kazuyuki Inoue.

Philately of Korea
Philately of Japan